George Anders Estman (8 September 1922 – 16 September 2006) was a South African cyclist. He competed at the 1948 and 1952 Summer Olympics. At the 1952 Olympics, he won a silver medal in the 4,000 metres team pursuit event.

References

External links
 
 

1922 births
2006 deaths
South African male cyclists
Olympic cyclists of South Africa
Cyclists at the 1948 Summer Olympics
Cyclists at the 1952 Summer Olympics
Olympic silver medalists for South Africa
Olympic medalists in cycling
Medalists at the 1952 Summer Olympics
20th-century South African people
21st-century South African people